Ruben Eugene Boykin Jr. (born June 20, 1985) is an American former professional basketball player who last played for the Sun Rockers Shibuya of the Japanese B.League.

Bio
Born in 1985 in Los Angeles, California Ruben lead the team and played varsity basketball for University High School in West Los Angeles and basketball for Northern Arizona University in Flagstaff, Arizona. He graduated with a Bachelor of Science in Journalism with a minor in Criminology & Criminal Justice. On June 28, 2007, Ruben went undrafted the 2007 NBA Draft making him an Unrestricted Free Agent. 
Under Pensack Sports Management Group, he played with Atlas Stal Ostrów, Wielkopolski, (Poland) 2007–2008, Aurora Fileni Jesi and Pall. Pavia, Casalpusterlengo (Italy) 2008–2011, VAP Kolossos Rodou (Greece) 2011–2012, BC Anwil, (Poland) 2012–2013, Northern Akita Happinets (Japan) 2013–2015, MHP RIESEN Ludwigsburg, (Germany) 2014, BG Gottingen Violets (Germany) 2015–2016.
Ruben then played with Bambitious in Nara, Japan, and Tokyo Z during the 2016–2018 under BG Sports Consultancy, LLC. He last signed to B1 (Division 1) Sunrockers Shibuya, in 2018.  
                                                                              
In 2015 he founded Train Like A Pro™ and became an exclusive trainer for high school, college and professional athletes continuing and preparing for their professional careers and those desiring to play professional basketball. He was also a Player Development Coach and Trainer for the Los Angeles Clippers Youth Summer League program and currently referees for high school men and women's basketball in Los Angeles, California, and Houston, Texas. He is an active member of the Texas Association of Sports Officials.
Some awards and accomplishments Ruben have fulfilled are over the years are: 
    2007–2008 All-Star Team, Poland
    2008–2010 2nd Team All-Italian Team
    2013–2014 Japan All-Star Team, EuroBasket.com Import of the Year, 1st Team All Japan, EuroBasket.com Defensive Player of the Year, Basketball Japan’s League Rebound Leader, EuroBasket.com MVP for Japan
    2013 & 2014 Seasons Basketball Japan’s Eastern Conference Champions

College statistics

|-
| style="text-align:left;"| 2003–04
| style="text-align:left;"| Northern Arizona
| 29 || 3 || 17.0 || .429 || .000 || .683|| 3.62 ||0.90  || 0.31 || 0.17 || 4.90
|-
| style="text-align:left;"| 2004–05
| style="text-align:left;"| Northern Arizona
| 28 || 27 || 29.2 || .471 || .200 || .760|| 7.29 ||1.79  || 1.00 || 0.36 || 11.36
|-
| style="text-align:left;"| 2005–06
| style="text-align:left;"| Northern Arizona
| 32 || 30 || 27.7 || .592 || .222 || .793|| 7.19 ||1.88  || 0.69 || 0.59 || 13.28
|-
| style="text-align:left;"| 2006–07
| style="text-align:left;"| Northern Arizona
| 30 || 30 || 31.8 || .516 || .432 || .769|| 8.93 ||3.10  || 0.77 || 0.53 || 16.43
|-
|- class="sortbottom"
! style="text-align:center;" colspan=2|  Career

!119 ||90 || 26.5 ||.512  || .343 ||.767  || 6.78 ||1.92  || 0.69 ||0.42  || 11.58
|-

NCAA Awards & Honors
All-Big Sky First Team – 2006, 2007
Big Sky All-Tournament Team – 2007

Career statistics

Regular season 

|-
| align="left" | 2007–08
| align="left" |Ostrów Wielkopolski
||23|| ||27.0||.503||.246||.756||6.4 ||1.4||2.1||0.8||11.9
|-
| align="left" | 2008–09
| align="left" |Jesi
||30|| ||32.2||.529||.364||.769||7.1 ||1.3||1.5||0.4||11.7
|-
| align="left" | 2009–10
| align="left" |Jesi
||15|| ||32.1||.500||.297||.818||7.3 ||1.4||1.9||1.0||12.7
|-
| align="left" | 2009–10
| align="left" |Pavia
||15|| ||31.6||.471||.273||.742||10.2 ||1.3||1.7||0.9||14.9
|-
| align="left" | 2010–11
| align="left" |Assigeco
||30|| ||30.8||.510||.347||.736||8.1 ||1.2||1.4||0.7||13.5
|-
| align="left" | 2011–12
| align="left" | Rodou
||35||34||24.4||.464||.308||.764||4.74 ||0.74||0.54||0.29||8.80
|-
| align="left" | 2012–13
| align="left" | Anwil
||44||37||25.8||.439||.312||.696||5.82 ||1.34||0.61||0.57||7.80
|-
| align="left" | 2013–14
| align="left" | Akita
||52||52||34||47.8%||35.7%||69.6%||bgcolor="CFECEC"|13.5 ||3.5||1.0||0.3||13.9
|-
| align="left" | 2014–15
| align="left" | Akita
| 52 || 27 || 26.5 || 43.0% || 36.8% || 75.7% || 6.9 || 4.0 || 0.6 || 0.5 || 10.6
|-
| align="left" | 2015–16
| align="left" | 	BG Göttingen
| 32 || 5 || 12.9 || 39.9% || 31.9% || 88.2% || 2.31 || 0.97 || 0.22 || 0.25 ||  4.88
|-
| align="left" | 2016–17
| align="left" | Nara
| 60 || 20 || 17.0 || 38.4% || 31.4% || 75.3% || 4.8 || 1.5 || 0.4 || 0.3 || 6.6
|-
| align="left" | 2017–18
| align="left" | Tokyo Z
| 38 ||10  || 24.8 ||44.2%  || 36.2% || 58.0% || 6.1||2.1 || 0.7||0.3 || 7.1
|-
| align="left" | 2017–18
| align="left" | Shibuya
| 22 ||0  || 9.5 ||40.0%  || 38.9% || 100.0% || 2.1||0.8 || 0.1||0.1 || 2.5
|-

Playoffs 

|-
|style="text-align:left;"|2007–08
|style="text-align:left;"|Ostrów Wielkopolski 
| 7 ||  || 20.7 || .488 || .462 || .846 || 4.1 || 1.7 || 2.0 || 0.9 ||8.1
|-
|style="text-align:left;"|2008–09
|style="text-align:left;"|Jesi 
| 5 ||  || 30.4 || .488 || .476 || .667 || 7.6 || 1.2 || 0.6 || 0.2 ||13.6
|-
|style="text-align:left;"|2011–12
|style="text-align:left;"|Rodou  
| 11 ||  || 18.0 || .434 || .250 || .625 || 2.6 || 0.9 || 0.4 || 0.3 ||5.5
|-
|style="text-align:left;"|2012–13
|style="text-align:left;"|Anwil  
| 10 ||  || 25.9 || .406 || .375 || 1.000 || 4.7 || 1.3|| 1.1 || 0.2 ||7.8
|-
|style="text-align:left;"|2013–14
|style="text-align:left;"|Akita
| 6 || 6 || 32.00 || .492 || .464 || .783 || 9.17 || 2.17 || 0.67 || 0.33 ||15.5
|-

Personal
Wife: Dr. Keyna (Kirklen Cobb) Boykin (Married July 2013)
Children: Canaan E. Boykin (Born 2015); Calvary V. Boykin (Born: 2017)
His younger brother Jamal is a professional basketball player.
He also has two older sisters, Desi and Serena.
Father Ruben Sr and mother Mary

References

1985 births
Living people
Akita Northern Happinets players
American expatriate basketball people in Germany
American expatriate basketball people in Greece
American expatriate basketball people in Italy
American expatriate basketball people in Japan
American expatriate basketball people in Poland
American men's basketball players
Bambitious Nara players
Basketball players from Los Angeles
BG Göttingen players
Earth Friends Tokyo Z players
KK Włocławek players
Kolossos Rodou B.C. players
Northern Arizona Lumberjacks men's basketball players
Sun Rockers Shibuya players